Judo at the 2021 Summer Deaflympics  was held in Caxias Do Sul, Brazil from 3 to 5 May 2022.

Medal summary

Medalists

Men's events

Women's events

References

External links
 Deaflympics 2021

2021 Summer Deaflympics
Deaflympics
Judo competitions in Brazil